Lenoncourt is a commune in the Meurthe-et-Moselle department in north-eastern France.

Population

In 2017, the municipality had 592 inhabitants, an increase of 6% compared to 2007.

Landmarks
 Numerous Gallo-Roman remains found in the 19th century. 
 Château de Lenoncourt 13th / 14th century: Founded by Thierry de Nancy. Protected under Historical Monuments. 
 Sondages salins de la valley of Roanne(also on commune of Varangéville) in Lenoncourt. Founded in 1855, the company Daguin had five groups of soundings in the valleys of Meurthe and Roanne. Boreholes are sheltered by well-structured pyramidal structures or in agglomerated crassier buildings with a two-sided roof. These saline soundings constitute an exceptional vestige of a mode of exploitation which had its full extension from the 1880s to the Second World War and have been registered with the historical monuments since 1986. The soundings were closed in 1967. 
 Church with a tower and nave 18th century, choir 15th century. 
 Presbytery 18th century.

See also
 Communes of the Meurthe-et-Moselle department

References

Communes of Meurthe-et-Moselle